Dough Nuts is a 1917 American silent comedy film featuring Oliver Hardy.

Cast
 Billy West as Billy, the New Baker
 Ethel Marie Burton as Ethel, the Cashier (as Ethel Burton)
 Oliver Hardy as Babe, the chef (as Babe Hardy)
 Leo White as Camembert, the Proprietor
 Bud Ross as Boob, the Assistant (as Budd Ross)
 Florence McLaughlin as Waitress (as Florence McLoughlin)
 Joe Cohen as Pierre
 Frank Bates as His Pal

See also
 List of American films of 1917
 Oliver Hardy filmography

External links

1917 films
American silent short films
American black-and-white films
1917 comedy films
1917 short films
Films directed by Arvid E. Gillstrom
Silent American comedy films
American comedy short films
1910s American films